José Ignacio Torreblanca Payá (born 1968) is a Spanish political analyst and political scientist. Working as opinion writer for El Mundo since 2018, he was the op-ed editor of El País from 2016 to 2018.

Biography 
Born in 1968 in Madrid, he earned a PhD in political science at the Complutense University of Madrid (UCM). He is full professor of the Universidad Nacional de Educación a Distancia (UNED). He has been a researcher for the Elcano Royal Institute.

Torreblanca became a regular columnist for El País in 2008. A noted europeanist, he also was the director of the Madrid office of the European Council on Foreign Relations (ECFR) think tank. In June 2016, he became the director of opinion of El País.

After Soledad Gallego-Díaz became the new editor-in-chief of El País in June 2018, Torreblanca left the newspaper and was replaced as op-ed editor by Máriam Martínez-Bascuñán. Torreblanca subsequently joined El Mundo as opinion writer in September 2018.

Awards 
 ; written press (2015)

Works

References 

El País columnists
Spanish opinion journalists
Spanish political scientists
El País op-ed editors
El Mundo (Spain) people
Academic staff of the National University of Distance Education
Complutense University of Madrid alumni
European Union and European integration scholars
1968 births
Living people